The Erhardt Conference is one of three conferences in the Elite Ice Hockey League (EIHL) and comprises four teams. Its counterparts are the Gardiner Conference and the newly formed, for the 2017-18 season, Patton Conference. It is named after the captain of the British 1936 Winter Olympics gold medal winning team Carl Erhardt and was introduced for the 2012–13 EIHL season. The Erhardt Conference Championship is played for over 24 regular season games, each team playing the other three teams eight times (four home and four away). The winner receives the Erhardt Trophy and is seeded in the top three (the exact seed dependent on the overall League Championship final standings) for the end-of-season Elite League Play-Offs. These 24 games also make up the total of 56 regular season games which decide the overall League Champions of the Elite Ice Hockey League.

Teams

Former Teams

Winners

References

External links
Elite Ice Hockey League Official Site
Hockeystats Elite League
British Ice Hockey
Ice Hockey UK
BBC Sport Ice Hockey
Hockey Database

Elite Ice Hockey League